The  is a railway line in Mie Prefecture, Japan, operated by private railway operator Kintetsu Railway, connecting Toba Station in Toba with Kashikojima Station in Shima.

The line connects with the Toba Line at Toba Station. The Yamada Line, Toba Line, and Shima Line form a single train line that begins at Ise-Nakagawa Station and serves the Ise-Shima tourist region.

Service
 LO  Local (普通 futsū)
 For 
 For 
(Locals stop at every station.)

 LE  Limited Express (特急 tokkyū)
 For ; via  (Nara)
 For ; via  and 
 For 
(Seat reservations and limited express fee required.)

 NS  Non-stop Limited Express (ノンストップ特急 nonsutoppu tokkyū)
 For 
 For 
 For 
(Runs twice a day on weekends.)
(Seat reservations and limited express fee required.)
 SV  Premium Express Shimakaze (しまかぜ Shimakaze)
 For 
 For 
 For 
 For 
(Train to and from Osaka runs once a day except on Tuesday with some exceptions.)
(Train to and from Kyoto runs once a day except on Wednesday with some exceptions.)
(Train to and from Nagoya runs once a day except on Thursday with some exceptions.)
(Seat reservations, limited express fee and "Shimakaze" special vehicle fee required.)

Stations

History

During the Meiji era, travelers coming to modern-day Shima walked along the Ise-Isobe road, now known as Mie Route 32. In 1911, as the Meiji era neared its end, the government-owned Sangū Line (now owned by JR Central) was extended from the city of Ujiyamada (modern-day Ise) to Toba, making Toba the default origin of any railroad to Shima, and not Ujiyamada. During the 1910s, as the Taishō period began, many plans were put forth by various members of the railroad industry, but none were implemented.

Shima Electric Railway
In 1923,  was established by Kakuya Morimoto, and by 1924 the plan for a railroad to Shima was finally approved. The original plan also specified that Ugata Station would be the terminus. However, shortly before construction began, a request was made to members of an already-established railway company, Tokyu Corporation, to see if the plan drawn up by Shima Electric Railway was sound. In the end, the only recommendation made was that the terminus be extended from Ugata to a nearby uninhabited island in Ago Bay called Kashiko Island, citing the island's natural beauty as conducive to establishing a profitable resort and tourism industry catering to travelers and pilgrims already coming to the area to visit nearby Ise Grand Shrine. However, the people living near Ugata, the original terminus, opposed the new plan because they felt having the line's endpoint in their area would bring economic benefit. This period of opposition lasted for four years, during which people living near Ugata refused to sell the land needed by Shima Electric Railway to lay track leading to Kashiko Island, thereby delaying construction. After an agreement was reached, the line was finally completed and opened in 1929, five years after the original plan had been drafted.

In 1944, Shima Electric Railway, along with six other companies, merged to form Mie Transport (Sanco). Twenty years later, the railway department of Sanco split off to become a separate company called Mie Electric Railway (Sanden), however this organization was short-lived as it was bought up by railway giant Kinki Nippon Railway (Kintetsu) the following year, and thus in 1965 the line came under its current name and ownership.

Kintetsu renovation
In acquiring the line, Kintetsu now had a problem because the Shima Line, which originated at Toba Station, was not connected with the rest of Kintetsu's extensive rail network which stretched only as far as Ujiyamada Station in Ise. Moreover, the railway gauge and voltage used on the Shima Line were different from the majority of Kintetsu lines, including the nearby Yamada Line which terminated at Ujiyamada. For the time being, Kintetsu offered bus service between Ujiyamada and Toba, but in the late 1960s they decided it was worthwhile to create a rail connection between the two in hopes of attracting customers from the upcoming 1970 World's Fair in Osaka by offering direct rail service to the area. Other improvements were added such as the ATS system, a new switching network, and gentler curves. The sharp increase of passengers on the line also motivated Kintetsu to invest money in a variety of tourism business enterprises in the Ise-Shima, especially along the Shima Line.

In 1986, it was decided that a second track on the Shima Line would assist in increasing the speed and number of trains on the line. Construction took several years and now most but not all of the line has dual tracks. The Aomine Tunnel between Shiraki and Gochi was also added to the line during this phase.

Timeline
July 23, 1929 - Toba - Kashikojima - Shinjukō section opened by Shima Electric Railway.
February 11, 1944 - Shima Electric Railway and six other companies merge to form Mie Transport (Sanco).  Line officially renamed Sanco Shima Line.
December 1, 1946 - Ugataguchi Station officially renamed to Shima-Yokoyama Station.
July 25, 1949 - Shima-Akasaki Station opens.
February 1, 1964 - Sanco railway division splits off and forms a new company Mie Electric Railway (Sanden). Line officially renamed Sanden Shima Line.
April 1, 1965 - Sanden, and all of its lines, are acquired by Kintetsu. Line officially renamed Shima Line.
July 1, 1969 - Freight service along the line ceases and Shinjukō Station closes. Kashikojima becomes endpoint.
December 10, 1969 - Shima Line is closed and construction to make various improvements on the line begins.
March 1, 1970 - Improvements are finished and the Shima Line reopens, now connected to the rest of the Kintetsu rail network. Shima-Isobe Station renamed Kaminogō; Hasama Station renamed Shima-Isobe.  Direct service begins from both Osaka and Nagoya to Kashikojima begins.
March 6, 1988 - Second track opens on Ugata to Shima-Shimmei section.
December 8, 1990 - Second track opens on Shima-Shimmei to Kashikojima section.
November 6, 1992 - Second track opens on Toba to Nakanogō section.
December 22, 1992 - Second track opens on Funatsu to Kamo section.
April 28, 1993 - Second track opens on Gochi to Kaminogō section.
June 1, 1993 - Second track opens on Shima-Isobe to Ugata section.
September 11, 1993 - Second track opens on Kamo to Gochi section. Aomine Tunnel completed.
September 21, 1993 - Tracks re-routed through Aomine Tunnel on Shiraki to Gochi section. Total line length reduced by 0.7 km.
May 30, 2001 - Wanman driver-only operation begins.

References

 Kintetsu Line Archives - Shima Line

External links
 Kintetsu railway network map - Osaka Line • Yamada Line • Toba Line • Shima Line
 Japan Guide - Shima Peninsula Travel - Shima Spain Village
 Japan Guide - Shima Peninsula Travel - Ago Bay

Shima Line
Rail transport in Mie Prefecture
Railway lines opened in 1929
1067 mm gauge railways in Japan
Standard gauge railways in Japan